Bob the Builder is a British animated children's television series created by Keith Chapman for HIT Entertainment and Hot Animation. The series follows the adventures of Bob, a building contractor, specialising in masonry, along with his colleague Wendy, various neighbours, and friends, and equipment, and their gang of anthropomorphised work-vehicles, Scoop, Muck, Dizzy, Roley, Lofty and many others. The show is broadcast in many countries but originated from the United Kingdom where Bob was voiced by English actor Neil Morrissey. The series originally used stop-motion from 1999 to 2009, but later used CGI animation starting with the spin-off series Ready, Steady, Build!. British proprietors of Bob the Builder and Thomas & Friends sold the enterprise in 2011 to US toy-maker Mattel for $680 million.

In each episode, Bob and his group help with renovations, construction, and repairs and with other projects as needed. The show emphasises conflict resolution, co-operation, socialisation, and various learning skills. Bob's catchphrase is "Can we fix it?", to which the other characters respond with "Yes we can!" This phrase is also the title of the show's theme song, which was a million-selling number one hit in the UK.

In October 2014, Bob the Builder was revamped by Mattel for a new series to be aired on Channel 5's Milkshake! in 2015. Amongst the changes were a complete overhaul of the cast, with Harry Potter actor Lee Ingleby replacing Neil Morrissey as the voice of Bob, and Joanne Froggatt and Blake Harrison also confirmed as the voices of Wendy and Scoop respectively. The setting and appearance of the characters also changed, with Bob and his team moving to the bustling metropolis of Spring City. An American localisation of the new series debuted on PBS Kids in November 2015. The changes have been criticised by fans of the original version.

The original series returned to TV in the United States on Qubo from 7 October 2020 through 28 February 2021 due to the channel's closure, but with the original British English dub instead of the dubbed American English one.

Episodes

Characters and voice actors

Voice actors who have contributed to the original British version include Neil Morrissey, Rob Rackstraw, Kate Harbour, Rupert Degas, Colin McFarlane, Maria Darling, Emma Tate, Richard Briers, and June Whitfield.

Celebrities who have provided voices for the series (usually for one-off specials) include John Motson, Sue Barker, Kerry Fox, Ulrika Jonsson, Alison Steadman, Stephen Tompkinson, Elton John, Noddy Holder, and Chris Evans (Bobsville's resident rock star Lennie Lazenby).

International broadcasts
Bob the Builder is shown in more than thirty countries, and versions are available in English, French, Spanish, Serbian, Swedish, Slovenian, German, Italian, Dutch, Hebrew, Hindi, Croatian, and Bengali, among other languages. It was shown on CBeebies on BBC television in the UK. It has also aired on Nick Jr. in the UK.

The North American version of the show uses the original British footage and script, but dubs the voices in American accents and slang; for example, the word "wrench" is used instead of "spanner", as wrench is the standard term for the tool in North America. The original North American voice of Bob (and Farmer Pickles/Mr. Beasley/Mr. Sabatini) was William Dufris, however, he was replaced with comedian Greg Proops. More recently, Bob's US voice has been provided by Marc Silk, an English voice actor from Birmingham. In the United States, the series first aired during the Nick Jr. block (from 2001 to 2004) before moving to PBS Kids for a long run, from 2005 until November 2018. Qubo also started airing the show from 7 October 2020 through 28 February 2021 due to the channel's closure, but with the original British English dub.

When being exported to Japan, it was reported that characters of Bob the Builder would be doctored to have five fingers instead of the original four. This was because of a practice among the Yakuza, the famed Japanese mafia, where members would "cut off their little fingers as a sign they can be trusted and have strength of character, and will stay through." In fact, Bob the Builder aired in Japan without such edits, as did other series including Postman Pat and The Simpsons.

Videos

Discography

Studio albums

Singles

Impact
Bob the Builder was nominated in the BAFTA "Pre-school animation" category from 1999 to 2009, and won the "Children's Animation" category in 2003 for the special episode "A Christmas to Remember". Of the show's success, Sarah Ball said:

Bob the Builder has been parodied by Robot Chicken in the episode "More Blood, More Chocolate", and by Comedy Inc. as Bodgy Builder.

Bob has also been parodied on Cartoon Network's MAD on several occasions. In the episode "S'UP / Mouse M.D.", Bob is seen with a smashed thumb and asks "Can we fix it?" In another episode, Bob encounters the title character of Handy Manny, whom he tells to "Stop copying my show!"

A New Yorker cartoon shows a parent in a toy store asking for toys depicting Alex the Architect, supposedly a white-collar equivalent to Bob the Builder.

Some have complained about technical errors and lack of proper safety practices in the programme, especially the absence of protective eyewear. However, in later episodes, Bob is seen using safety glasses.

Project: Build It

In May 2005, a sort of spin-off series was released titled Bob the Builder: Project: Build It. Bob hears of a contest to build a new community in a remote area called Sunflower Valley, outside of Bobsville. He moves from Bobsville (supposedly temporarily) with Wendy and the machines and builds a new Yard there. Bob convinces his father, Robert, to come out of retirement and take over the Bobsville building business. It is unknown whether Bob returned to Bobsville in the stop-motion series or not after this spin-off series was finished.

For the US version of the Project: Build It series, different actors were found to do the voices for many of the human characters, including casting Greg Proops as the new voice of Bob, and Rob Rackstraw, who played the original voices of Scoop, Muck and Travis, to be the voices of Spud the Scarecrow and Mr. Bentley for both the UK and the US. The show also added recycling and being environmentally friendly to its lessons, emphasising the phrase "Reduce, Reuse, Recycle."

This series premiered on 2 May 2005 in the United Kingdom and 3 September of the same year in the United States, and was the first series made in HD 1080p.

Ready, Steady, Build!
The third spin-off was titled Bob the Builder: Ready, Steady, Build! It was created by Keith Chapman and Mallory Lewis. The group, now joined by newcomer Scratch are now residing in the town of Fixham Harbour (which is very similar to Bobsville, and is even implied to be Bobsville in several episodes), deal with construction and other building tasks around the area. Unlike previous series, Ready, Steady, Build! is animated in full CGI animation, which allows for larger and more elaborate construction projects that would be too large or expensive for the model sets of the stop-motion series, though it still retains the theme song.

Merchandise

Various companies manufacture licensed Bob the Builder merchandise (e.g.: Brio, Lego Duplo, Hasbro, Learning Curve, etc.) since about 1999 to present. Sometimes some fans make fan-made merchandise for the television show, such as racing games that are not related to the show.

Lego Duplo/Explore
Lego began manufacturing licensed Duplo Bob the Builder sets in 2001. Lego Explorer also made the sets using the same bricks that Duplo used (e.g. Naughty Spud, Wallpaper Wendy, etc.). The sets were aimed at younger children, two and up. Duplo manufactured the sets (e.g. Scoop at Bobland Bay, Muck Can Do It, etc.) until 2009 when Lego's contract expired.

Hasbro
Hasbro created licensed Bob the Builder characters. They included talking characters and others to go with the Bob the Builder line. The Hasbro line was discontinued in 2005 when Learning Curve took over.

Learning Curve
Learning Curve among countless others held a license to make the toys, but discontinued them. They first merchandised their Bob the Builder products in 2005 after the Hasbro range was discontinued. Learning Curve also created the Thomas & Friends characters, while the company still makes the sets (e.g. Scoop, Muck, Lofty, Dizzy, Andy's trailer etc.) and then sold them to stores. They discontinued them in 2010 and it is unknown if they could ever return to making them. The toys are currently available in the United Kingdom by Character Options.

Character World
In 2012, Character World announced that they had signed a license to manufacture official Bob the Builder bedding and bedroom textiles. A duvet cover is said to be available in the UK in late 2012.

Video games
Various video game publishers released Bob the Builder video games throughout the 2000's:

 Fix it Fun! (Game Boy Color, NTSC/PAL) - 2000
 Can We Fix It? (PC, PS1, NTSC/PAL) - 2001
 Bob Builds a Park (PC, NTSC/PAL) - 2002
 Bob's Castle Adventure (PC, NTSC/PAL) - 2003
 Project: Build It (PS2, PAL only) - 2005
 Bob the Builder: Festival of Fun (PS2, Wii, Nintendo DS, PAL only) - 2007
 Bob the Builder: Can-Do-Zoo (PC, NTSC/PAL) - 2008

In the United States, Bob the Builder: Can We Fix It?s computer version sold 350,000 copies and earned $6.1 million by August 2006, after its release in August 2001. It was the country's 50th best-selling computer game between January 2000 and August 2006. Combined sales of all Bob the Builder computer games released between January 2000 and August 2006 had reached 520,000 units in the United States by the latter date.

Kiddie rides

Jolly Roger (Amusement Rides) Ltd. released two kiddie rides based on the series, a Scoop in January 2000, and a Roley in March 2003. In March 2003, Scoop was re-released with a new dashboard and a Stamar soundboard. Then, in 2004, versions of both rides were released with video screens.

References

External links
 

Channels
 Bob the Builder on ABC 4 Kids
 Bob the Builder on CBeebies
 Bob the Builder on Česká Televize
 Bob the Builder on Nick Jr. UK 
 Bob the Builder on Sprout
 Bob the Builder on Télé-Québec 
 Bob the Builder on TOGOLINGO
 Bob the Builder on Treehouse TV
 Official website on pbskids.org

Others
Official website 

 
BBC children's television shows
Clay animation television series
British stop-motion animated television series
British computer-animated television series
1990s preschool education television series
2000s preschool education television series
2010s preschool education television series
British children's animated comedy television series
British children's animated fantasy television series
Television series by Mattel Creations
Television series by Cosgrove Hall Films
1999 British television series debuts
2011 British television series endings
PBS original programming
PBS Kids shows
Nick Jr. original programming
1990s British children's television series
2000s British children's television series
2010s British children's television series
1990s British animated television series
2000s British animated television series
2010s British animated television series
Television shows adapted into video games
British preschool education television series
Animated preschool education television series
CBeebies
Qubo
HIT Entertainment